Martina Valmassoi (born 26 July 1989 in Pieve di Cadore) is an Italian ski mountaineer.

Selected results 
 2011:
 5th, World Championship, relay, together with Corinne Clos and Silvia Piccagnoni
 5th, World Championship team, together with Corinne Clos
 5th, Pierra Menta, together with Mireille Richard
 2012:
 3rd, European Championship, relay, together with Gloriana Pellissier and Elena Nicolini
 4th, European Championship, together with Corinne Clos
 10th, European Championship, sprint

References 

1989 births
Living people
Italian female ski mountaineers
People from San Pietro di Cadore
Sportspeople from the Province of Belluno